Bon Irau, with an elevation of , is the highest peak in the Tamrau Mountains and the highest point in the province of West Papua outside of the Arfak Mountains.

References
WWF Bird Watching on Bird's Head, and the threats to the Vogelkop montane rain forests ecoregion. Accessed 5 March 2015
Arfak Mountains: Birding Hotspot of West Papua Accessed 5 March 2015

Landforms of West Papua (province)
Mountains of Western New Guinea
West Papua (province)